Pabellón Príncipe Felipe is an arena in Zaragoza, Spain. Opened on 17 April 1990, the arena holds 10,744 people. It is primarily used for basketball (home of Basket Zaragoza) and handball (home of Caja3 Aragón).

Events hosted
The arena hosted the 1990 and 1995 Euroleague Final Fours, as well as the 1999 Saporta Cup Final in which Benneton Treviso defeated Pamesa Valencia.

The arena frequently hosts rock bands, such as David Bowie, Oasis, Iron Maiden and Depeche Mode.

Controversy about naming
On 24 July 2015, the Zaragoza City Hall changed the name of Pabellón Príncipe Felipe to Pabellón José Luis Abós, in honor of the beloved coach of CAI Zaragoza, who died in October 2014.

As a result of a controversy about changing the name of the pavilion, approved without majority in the voting in the City Hall, CAI Zaragoza did not support the change.

Finally, the process of changing the name was stopped judicially.

See also
 List of indoor arenas in Spain

References

External links

Basketball venues in Spain
Handball venues in Spain
Indoor arenas in Spain
Sport in Zaragoza
Sports venues in Aragon
Boxing venues in Spain
1990 establishments in Spain
Sports venues completed in 1990